Lakkapuram or Punjai Lakkapuram is a Village Panchayat located in Erode district, in the Indian state of Tamil Nadu. Lakkapuram village falls under Modakurichi taluk.

Demographics 
 census, Lakkapuram village had a total population of 9,739 with 4,875 males and 4,864 females. Out of the total population 869 are under 6 years of age. Lakkapuram has a literacy rate of 79.62% which is lower than Tamil Nadu average.

Lakkapuram Hill Temple
Lakkapuram Murugan Temple is one of the famous Hindu temples dedicated to Lord Muruga, located in the city of Erode, on Erode-Karur Highways. Temple named Sempu Malai.

Location
It is about 9 km from Erode Central Bus Terminus, 6 km from Erode Junction and 7 km from Erode Junction Bus station in Tamil Nadu, India. The village is located on the National Highway-381A, where it bisects Erode Ring Road.

Being situated in the southern periphery of Erode, the Erode Municipal Corporation has decided to expand its limit by merging Lakkapuram into its jurisdiction.

Notable Personalities 
Dr.S.VetriVel
Dr. L. M. Ramakrishnan - philanthropist and correspondent B.V.B institutions.
Dr. L. S. Subramaniam - philanthropist and a famous children's specialist.
Mr. L. S. Ramamurthy - philanthropist.

Economy
The economy of this urban area is majorly deal with Power-looms, Textile production.

A vast number of Loom units were present in this area resulting in textile trade.

Kongu Vellala Gounders, a community with a strong agricultural background in the surrounding villages, are also engaged in commerce in the town.

With the Regional Transport Office (RTO) just a kilometre from Lakkapuram, and the belief that the corporation area to be extended, the real estate price have soared up..

References

Villages in Erode district